Dongjinzhuang Township is a township of Lianchi District, Baoding, Hebei, People's Republic of China. , it has 17 villages under its administration:
Dongjinzhuang Village
Liangzhuang Village
Yindingzhuang Village
Hexinzhuang Village
Mijiadi Village
Guoxinzhuang Village
Donghouying Village
Zhangxinzhuang Village
Houxinzhuang Village
Qianxinzhuang Village
Lanxinzhuang Village
Wangxinzhuang Village
Xikangge Village
Xiaodi Village
Mazhuang Village
Shangzhuang Village
Fu Village

See also 
List of township-level divisions of Hebei

References 

Township-level divisions of Hebei
Lianchi District